Chuck Reichow (March 19, 1901 – March 29, 1993) was a fullback in the National Football League. He played with the Milwaukee Badgers during the 1925 NFL season before playing the following season with the Racine Tornadoes.

References

1901 births
1993 deaths
Milwaukee Badgers players
Racine Tornadoes players
American football fullbacks
University of St. Thomas (Minnesota) alumni
St. Thomas (Minnesota) Tommies football players
Players of American football from Saint Paul, Minnesota